Brownlow Villiers Layard (14 July 1804 – 27 December 1853) was an Irish Whig politician.

References

External links
 

UK MPs 1841–1847
Whig (British political party) MPs for Irish constituencies
1804 births
1853 deaths